Maison Blanche (White House in French) was a department store in New Orleans, Louisiana.

Maison Blanche may also refer to:

 Maison Blanche Airport, a former name of Houari Boumediene Airport in Algiers
 Maison Blanche (Paris Métro)
 Maison blanche (villa), a house designed by Le Corbusier in La Chaux-de-Fonds, Switzerland
 Maison blanche, les Saintes, a quartier of Terre-de-Haut Island
 Dar El Beïda, Algeria, formerly called Maison Blanche
 Neuville-St Vaast German war cemetery, near Arras, Pas-de-Calais, France

See also
 Reims-Maison-Blanche station
 White House (disambiguation)